Marco Badoer da Santa Giustina (died 1288) was a Venetian administrator, diplomat and military commander.

Marco was born in the early years of the 13th century. His father, Marino, was the procurator of Saint Mark from 1223. He married Marchesina, daughter of Doge Pietro Ziani and his second wife, Constance, daughter of King Tancred of Sicily. They had several children: Marino, Marco (called del Sestrier di San Marco to distinguish him from his father), Ruggero, Giovanni, Badoaro, Andrea, Sibilla and Maria.

In 1256, Pope Alexander IV declared a crusade against the tyrant Ezzelino III da Romano and formed a league with Venice. The papal legate named Marco marshal and podestà of the army of the league, while Tommaso Giustiniani da San Pantalon was named governor and Azzo VII d'Este captain-general. Following Ezzelino's death in October 1259, he occupied Treviso, where he served as podestà from 19 October 1259 until 6 August 1260. He governed with the counsel of ten consuls and twelve elders. He declared void all sales of property made in the previous fifteen years and on 16 March 1260 confiscated all the property of Ezzelino and his brother Alberico. He harnessed the resources of Treviso for the final phase of the war. He then besieged Alberico da Romano in San Zenone until he surrendered on 23 August.

In 1261, Marco was one of the electors of the Maggior Consiglio. That year he was a member of the embassy sent to congratulate Pope Urban IV on his election and ask for papal assistance in recovering Constantinople for the Latin Empire. The future doge Jacopo Contarini was also on this mission.

After two months, he turned command over to Jacopo Dondulo. In 1275, he was one of the rectors of the Dogato between the death of Lorenzo Tiepolo and the election of Jacopo Contarini. In 1278, he drew up his will, requesting burial in Santa Maria Gloriosa dei Frari. That year, he was sent with Andrea Zeno and Guiberto Dandolo to congratulate Pope Nicholas III on his election, but the pope refused to receive them because of Venice's war with Ancona.

In 1281, Marco was on the Minor Council. In 1282, he was podestà of Chioggia. His date of death is unrecorded, but was probably in 1288. His children are recorded executing his will that year.

Notes

Bibliography

13th-century births
1288 deaths
Badoer family
Ambassadors of the Republic of Venice to the Holy See
Venetian governors